Noah is the debut studio album of the Danish duo Noah. It was released on 20 May 2013 on Copenhagen Records debuting at number 2 in its first week of release. The duo had already pre-released two successful singles from the album in 2012, namely "Alt er forbi" and "Over byen". Just prior to the release of the album, Noah released yet a third single "Det' okay" from the album.

Track listing
All songs by Troels Gustavsen and Lasse Dyrholm
"Det' okay" (4:02)
"Ekko" (3:27)
"Over byen" (4:04)
"Dine fodspor" (3:38)
"Når vi falder" (4:06)
"Tilbage til mig selv" (4:18)
"Alt er forbi" (3:57)
"Kun dig og mig" (3:08)
"Mælkevej" (4:23)
"Godnat København" (3:36)

Charts

References

2013 debut albums
Danish-language albums